Sarıbaşak can refer to:

 Sarıbaşak, Karakoçan
 Sarıbaşak, Olur